MS Trollfjord is a Hurtigruten vessel built by Fosen mekaniske verksteder in Rissa, Norway in 2002. It is named after the Norwegian Trollfjord. She has a sister ship, which also sails for Hurtigruten.

References

External links 

Hurtigruten ASA Official homepage - MS Trollfjord
Mike Bent's Hurtigruten-pages - MS Trollfjord
 Hurtigruten-Web.com

Passenger ships of Norway
Ships built in Rissa, Norway
2002 ships
Merchant ships of Norway
Hurtigruten